Argutite (GeO2) is a rare germanium oxide mineral. It is a member of the rutile group.

It was first described for an occurrence in the Argut deposit, central Pyrenees, Haute-Garonne, France in 1983. The type locality is within a zinc ore deposit within  lower Paleozoic sedimentary rocks that have undergone metamorphism. Associated minerals include sphalerite, cassiterite, siderite and briartite.

See also 

 List of minerals

References 

Oxide minerals
Germanium minerals